The Z22 class (formerly L.436 class) was a class of steam locomotives built for the New South Wales Government Railways in Australia.

See also
NSWGR steam locomotive classification

References

22
Scrapped locomotives
Standard gauge locomotives of Australia
Railway locomotives introduced in 1890
2-6-0 locomotives